The 2017 Agua da Serra Campeonato Brasileiro de Turismo (Brazilian Touring Championship), also known as Stock Car Brasil Light, It's the fifth season of The Campeonato Brasileiro de Turismo, a second-tier series to Stock Car Brasil.

Teams and drivers
All cars were powered by V8 engines and used the JL chassis. All drivers were Brazilian-registered.

Race calendar and results
All races were held in Brazil.

Championship standings
Points system
Points are awarded for each race at an event to the driver/s of a car that completed at least 75% of the race distance and was running at the completion of the race. 

Race: Used for the first and second race, with partially reversed (top six) of each event.
Final race: Used for the last round of the season with double points.

Drivers' Championship

References

External links

Campeonato Brasileiro de Turismo
Stock Car Brasil